Giorgia Palmas (born 5 March 1982) is an Italian television personality, actress and model. She became famous following her appearances on the Italian television show Striscia la notizia.

Biography
Palmas was born in Cagliari. She began her career in the year 2000, coming second in Miss World, losing to Miss India, Priyanka Chopra. In 2001, she was in Buona Domenica, as a microfonina. In 2002, she won the television show Veline, becoming the brunette velina, in pair with Elena Barolo, the new blonde velina. For two television seasons, 2002/2003 and 2003/2004, she was a velina in Striscia la notizia, gaining her a lot of popularity. After leaving Striscia la notizia she appeared in Italia 1 summer edition of Lucignolo, with Elena Barolo. In September of the same year she was in Rai 1 show, I Raccomandati. She was chosen to be testimonial of "Cotton Club" brand underwear. In February 2005, she appeared fully topless in a photoshoot on Max Magazine. In June 2005 she was in CD Live Estate on RAI 2. She has been confirmed also for the next season. She is the winner of the reality show L'isola dei famosi. 
She won the reality show in front of 4,842,000 viewers in Italian with 21.90% share with an audience of the final 46%. L'isola dei famosi shows to beat the strong competition of RAI and Mediaset

Since 17 June 2013 back to Sprint Paperissima lead throughout the summer, next to Vittorio Brumotti and Gabibbo.

Private life
From 2004 to 2011, she was engaged to footballer Davide Bombardini, from which they had a daughter, Sofia. From 2012 to 2017, she was romantically linked to bike trial champion, Vittorio Brumotti with whom she hosted several editions of the summer television program "Paperissima Sprint". Since 2018, she has been romantically linked to swimmer Filippo Magnini whom she later married civilly on May 12, 2021 and on May 14, 2022 in church, and with whom she had a second daughter.

Filmography

As an actress

As herself

References

External links

1982 births
Winners in the Survivor franchise
Living people
Association footballers' wives and girlfriends
Miss World 2000 delegates
People from Cagliari
Participants in Italian reality television series
Survivor (franchise) winners
Italian female models
Italian beauty pageant winners
Sardinian women